Dig These Blues is the sixth album led by saxophonist Hank Crawford featuring performances recorded in 1964 and 1965 for the Atlantic label.

Reception

AllMusic awarded the album 3½ stars.

Track listing
All compositions by Hank Crawford except as indicated
 "Dig These Blues" - 4:34
 "Don't Get Around Much Anymore" (Duke Ellington, Bob Russell) - 5:04 
 "Banana Head" - 3:00
 "H.C. Blues" - 2:50
 "These Tears" - 2:37 
 "Hollywood Blues" - 3:20
 "Baby Won't You Please Come Home" (Charles Warfield. Clarence Williams) - 5:48
 "New Blues" (Phineas Newborn, Jr.) - 4:25
 "Bluff City Blues" - 3:54

Personnel 
Hank Crawford - alto saxophone, piano
Oliver Beener (tracks 1, 3 & 5), Marcus Belgrave (tracks 2, 7 & 9), Julius Brooks (tracks 4, 6 & 8), Phil Guilbeau (tracks 1, 3 & 5), John Hunt (tracks 4, 6 & 8), Jimmy Owens (tracks 2, 7 & 9) - trumpet 
 Abdul Baari (tracks 2, 7 & 9), Wilbur Brown (tracks 4, 6 & 8), Wendell Harrison (tracks 1, 3 & 5) - tenor saxophone
Leroy Cooper (tracks 1, 3-6 & 8), Howard Johnson (tracks 2, 7 & 9) - baritone saxophone
Charles Green (tracks 2, 7 & 9), Ali Mohammed (tracks 1, 3 & 5), Edgar Willis (tracks 4, 6 & 8) - bass
Bruno Carr (tracks 1, 3-6 & 8), Milt Turner (tracks 2, 7 & 9) - drums

References 

1966 albums
Hank Crawford albums
Atlantic Records albums
Albums produced by Nesuhi Ertegun
Albums produced by Arif Mardin